Asgat is a sum (district) of Sükhbaatar Province in eastern Mongolia. In 2009, its population was 1,806.

References 

Districts of Sükhbaatar Province